Elohor Eva Alordiah (born 13 August 1989), better known as Eva Alordiah or simply Eva, is a Nigerian rapper, make-up artist, fashion designer and entrepreneur. A native of Delta State, Eva was born and raised in Abuja. She is regarded as one of the best female rappers in Nigeria. Her contributions to the Nigerian music industry have earned her several accolades, including one Nigeria Entertainment Award, one Eloy Award, and one YEM award. Her debut EP, titled Gigo (Garbage in Garbage Out), was released for free digital download on 20 November 2011. Eva is the owner of makeupByOrsela, a company that specializes in makeup services. In November 2014, Eva released her eponymous second extended play Eva. Her debut studio album 1960 was released in September 2016.

Career

1989–2009: Early life and career beginnings 
A native of Delta State, Eva Alordiah was born on 13 August 1989, in Abuja, Nigeria. She got introduced to music by her mother, who listened to musical recordings from the 1970s and 1980s. Eva has cited Michael Jackson, Bob Marley, Sade Adu, The Carpenters, John Lennon and Don Williams as her key musical influences. Growing up, she partook in several forms of art and was fond of drawing and reading books. She sang in her church's choir and joined the drama club while in secondary school. When she was 10 years old, she wrote a short story in her notebook and dreamt of being an author. After learning of Eminem, she began to write rap verses and was inspired to pursue a professional career in rap music. Eva's love for words and rhyming pulled her deeper into the hip-hop genre. At the age of 16, she found herself balancing school and business. With an ambition to make money and become independent, she started auditioning for acting and modeling roles. Eva sold second-hand clothing in school as a means to an end. Eva began her career as a photography model. She took pictures and auditioned for several jobs. She graduated with a degree in Computer Science from Bowen University.

In 2009, Eva released "I Dey Play" as her first-ever studio recording. The song features vocals by Tha Suspect and was recorded over Lil Wayne's "A Milli" instrumental.

2011–2013: Gigo (Garbage in Garbage Out) and Trybe Records 

Eva was featured on Strbuttah's single "Make 'em Say". Released in January 2011, the music video for the song was directed by Rcube of Strbuttah. Eva made her TV debut in the music video. She later appeared on the female version of Tha Suspect's song "I No Send You". The music video for the song was released in March 2011.

Eva started working on her debut EP, titled Gigo (Garbage in Garbage Out), as an independent artist. The EP is an acronym for Garbage in Garbage Out and was released on 20 November 2011. It comprises 9 tracks and was released for free digital download. The EP was supported by four singles: "I Done Did It", "Down Low", "Garbage Out (Your Fada)", and "High". Its production was handled by Sossick, Tintin, and Gray Jon'z. "I Done Did It" was produced by Sossick and released as the EP's lead single. In a 2012 interview with Halley Bondy of MTV Iggy, Eva said she was honored to have worked with the aforementioned producers. She also said she had fun recording the EP. Eva released the second single "High" in 2012. The music video for the song was directed by Mex and released on 24 May 2012. It was uploaded to YouTube at a total length of 4 minutes and 37 seconds. The video premiered on MTV Base in May 2012. When the video was released, many people misconstrued the song's meaning and thought it alluded to drug use. In the aforementioned interview with Bondy of MTV Iggy, Eva said the song is about overcoming the struggles and hardships of life.

In May 2012, it was reported that Eva signed a record deal with Da Trybe 2.0, a record label owned by record producer and recording artist eLDee. In November 2013, Ariya Today reported that Eva was dropped from Trybe Records. According to the press release signed by the management of the recording outfit, Eva's ideas and foresight didn't align with the label's plans. In an interview with BellaNaija, Eva denied reports about being signed to Trybe Records despite the press release statements from the label. After the Trybe Records saga in 2012, she took a break from the music scene and spent time reflecting on her craft. 

In February 2013, she worked with producer Sossick to release "Mercy", a song that was made available for download on her blogsite. The song was produced and co-written by Sossick. In December 2013, U.K producer Drox featured her in the music video for his song "Mercy". He released several official remixes of the song, including a "Summer" mix and a "Jackin Storm" mix. On 29 July 2013, Eva released the promotional single "Lights Out". The song was produced by Gray Jon'z. The music video for the song was directed by Patrick Elis. In an interview with the Leadership newspaper, Eva said she recorded the song to showcase her versatility as an artist. In August 2013, Eva signed a management deal with Radioactiiv. That same month, Nokia Nigeria enlisted her as one of the judges for its annual Don't Break Da Beat competition.

2014–present: 1960, Eva, and Because You Been Waiting
Eva started working on her debut studio album, 1960, as early as 2012. The album was produced by Tintin and Gray Jon'z. On 24 January 2014, Eva released the Gray Jon'z-produced track "Deaf" as the album's lead single. It premiered three months after the premiere of the "Lights Out" video. The music video for "Deaf" was shot and directed by Patrick Elis. The song has been remixed by rapper Boogey. Eva organised a rap competition exclusively for girls to promote the song. Eva stated in an interview that she loves creating visual content, and has successfully co-directed all of her music videos to date.  

Eva was featured in the Lagos edition of BBC Radio 1xtra's Live Lounge alongside M.I, 2face Idibia, Wizkid and Iyanya. As part of the feature, artists were asked to freestyle. Eva collaborated with Burna Boy, Endia, Yung L, and Sarkodie on an unreleased song that was initially intended to be the theme song for the third season of Shuga. Instead of using the Chopstix-produced song, MTV Base chose the Del B-produced track "Sweet Like Shuga", which features vocals from Flavour N'abania, Sound Sultan, Chidinma, Kcee and Professor. On 11 March 2014, Eva released her version of the unreleased theme song titled "Shuga".

On 31 August 2014, Thisday newspaper reported that Eva became an ambassador of Guinness Nigeria's Made of Black campaign alongside Olamide and Phyno. Eva performed at the campaign's launch and was featured in its television commercial. On 25 September 2014, "War Coming" was released as the second single from 1960. The song was produced by Tintin and features guest vocals by Sir Dauda. On 6 November 2014, Eva announced the album's title and said it would be released in January 2015. The album features guest collaborations with Darey Art Alade, Femi Kuti, Yemi Alade, Olamide, Sarkodie and Sir Dauda. Eva released her eponymous second EP for free digital download on 20 November 2014. On 6 March 2015, she premiered the Mex-directed music video for "War Coming".

Eva's debut mixtape, titled Because You Been Waiting, was released on 1 March 2016. Comprising five tracks, one of the mixtape's songs samples DMX's 2000 single "What These Bitches Want". In January 2020, after a hiatus from music, Eva released the Jesse Alordiah-produced single "Friend or Foe". She co-directed the song's music video with Ibukun Williams.

Discography 
Studio albums
1960 (2016)

EPs
Gigo (Garbage in Garbage Out) (2011)
Eva (2014)

Mixtapes
Because You Been Waiting (2016)

Awards and nominations

Notes

References

External links 
 Eva Alordiah at SoundCloud

1989 births
Nigerian women rappers
Living people
21st-century Nigerian musicians
Musicians from Abuja
Bowen University alumni
Nigerian cosmetics businesspeople
Nigerian make-up artists
Nigerian hip hop singers
Nigerian reggae singers
21st-century women musicians
Women hip hop singers